College of Veterinary Science and Animal Husbandry may refer to:

College of Veterinary Science and Animal Husbandry, Anand
College of Veterinary Science and Animal Husbandry (Bhubaneshwar), Orissa
College of Veterinary Science and Animal Husbandry, Jalukie, Nagaland
College Of Veterinary Science And Animal Husbandry (Mathura), Uttar Pradesh
College Of Veterinary Science And Animal Husbandry (Mhow), Madhya Pradesh
School of Veterinary Sciences & Animal Husbandry, Pasighat